The Archdiocese of Parakou is the Metropolitan See for the Ecclesiastical province of Parakou in Benin.

History
 13 May 1948: Established as Apostolic Prefecture of Parakou from the Apostolic Prefecture of Niamey, Niger 
 10 February 1964: Promoted as Diocese of Parakou
 16 October 1997: Promoted as Metropolitan Archdiocese of Parakou

Special churches
The seat of the archbishop is Cathédrale Saints Pierre et Paul in Parakou.

Bishops

Ordinaries, in reverse chronological order
 Metropolitan Archbishops of Parakou (Roman rite), below
 Archbishop Pascal N’Koué: 14 June 2011 - Present
 Archbishop Fidèle Agbatchi: 14 April 2004  – 4 November 2010, resigned
 Archbishop Nestor Assogba: 16 October 1997  – 29 October 1999, appointed Archbishop of Cotonou; see below
 Bishop of Parakou (Roman rite), below
 Bishop Nestor Assogba: 10 April 1976  – 16 October 1997; see above

Other priests of this diocese who became bishops
Clet Feliho, appointed Bishop of Kandi in 2000
Aristide Gonsallo, appointed Bishop of Porto Novo in 2015

Suffragan dioceses
 Djougou
 Kandi
 N’Dali
 Natitingou

See also
 Catholic Church in Benin
 List of Roman Catholic dioceses in Benin

References

External links
 GCatholic.org 

Roman Catholic dioceses in Benin
Christian organizations established in 1948
Parakou
Roman Catholic dioceses and prelatures established in the 20th century
 
Roman Catholic ecclesiastical provinces in Benin
1948 establishments in French Dahomey